Jamides zebra is a butterfly of the lycaenids or blues family first described by Hamilton Herbert Druce in 1895. It is found in South-east Asia.

Subspecies
 J. z. zebra – (Borneo)
 J. z. lakatti Corbet, 1940 – (Peninsular Malaya)
 J. z. megana Corbet, 1940 – (Mentawi Islands)
 J. z. vaneeckei (Fruhstorfer, 1915) – (Nias)

References

Druce, Hamilton H. (1895). "A monograph of the Bornean Lycaenidae". Proceedings of the Zoological Society of London. 1895: 556-627, 4 pls.
Seki, Y., Takanami, Y. & Otsuka, K. (1991). Butterflies of Borneo. 2 (1) Lycaenidae. Tobishima Corporation, Tokyo.

Butterflies described in 1895
Jamides
Butterflies of Borneo